This is a list of international trips made by Kyriakos Mitsotakis, as Prime Minister of Greece, since his inauguration on 8 July 2019.

Summary of international trips

2019 
Mitsotakis' trips in 2019:

2020 

Mitsotakis' trips in 2020:

2021 
Mitsotakis' trips in 2021:

2022 
Mitsotakis' trips in 2022:

References 

Lists of 21st-century trips
21st century in international relations
Mitsotakis
International trips made by Kyriakos Mitsotakis